Mastercard Inc. (stylized as MasterCard from 1979–2016, mastercard from 2016–2019) is the second-largest payment-processing corporation worldwide. It offers a range of financial services. Its headquarters are in Purchase, New York. Throughout the world, its principal business is to process payments between the banks of merchants and the card-issuing banks or credit unions of the purchasers who use the Mastercard-brand debit, credit and prepaid cards to make purchases. Mastercard has been publicly traded since 2006.

Mastercard (originally Interbank then Master Charge) was created by an alliance of several banks and regional bankcard associations in response to the BankAmericard issued by Bank of America, which later became Visa, still its biggest competitor. Prior to its initial public offering, Mastercard Worldwide was a cooperative owned by the more than 25,000 financial institutions that issue its branded cards.

History

Although BankAmericard's debut in September 1958 was a notorious disaster,  it began to turn a profit by May 1961. Bank of America deliberately kept this information secret and allowed then-widespread negative impressions to linger in order to ward off competition. This strategy was successful until 1966, when BankAmericard's profitability had become far too big to hide. From 1960 to 1966, there were only 10 new credit cards introduced in the United States, but from 1966 to 1968, approximately 440 credit cards were introduced by banks large and small throughout the country. These newcomers promptly banded together into regional bankcard associations.

One reason why most banks chose to join forces was that at the time, 16 states limited the ability of banks to operate through branch locations, while 15 states entirely prohibited branch banking and required unit banking. A unit bank can legally operate only at a single site and is thereby forced to remain very small. By joining a regional bankcard association, a unit bank could quickly add a credit card to its lineup of financial products, and achieve economies of scale by outsourcing tedious back office tasks like card servicing to the association. Such associations also enabled unit banks to aggregate their customer bases and merchant networks in order to make a credit card useful for both customers and merchants; early credit cards had failed because they could only be used within a small radius around their respective issuing banks.

In 1966, Karl H. Hinke, an executive vice president at Marine Midland Bank, asked representatives of several other banks to meet him in Buffalo, New York.  Marine Midland had just launched its own regional bankcard in the Upstate New York market after Bank of America declined its request for a BankAmericard regional license on the basis that Marine Midland was too big.  The result of the Buffalo meeting was that several banks and regional bankcard associations soon agreed to join forces as Interbankard, Inc., which then became the Interbank Card Association (ICA). By the end of 1967, ICA had 150 members and Hinke became ICA's chairman.  Bank of America eventually joined MasterCard as well.  (In the 21st century, Bank of America would revive the BankAmericard brand name as a Mastercard credit card, which it remains today).

The Interbank branding in 1966 initially consisted only of a small unobtrusive lowercase i inside a circle in the lower right-hand corner of the front of each Interbank card; the rest of the card design was the prerogative of each issuing bank. This tiny logo proved to be entirely unsatisfactory for creating nationwide brand awareness in order to compete against the established leader, BankAmericard. In 1969, Interbank developed a new national brand, "Master Charge: The Interbank Card" by combining the two overlapping yellow and orange circles of the Western States Bankcard Association with the "Master Charge" name coined by the First National Bank of Louisville, Kentucky.

That same year, First National City Bank joined Interbank and merged its proprietary Everything Card with Master Charge.

In 1968, the ICA and Eurocard started a strategic alliance, which effectively allowed the ICA access to the European market, and for Eurocard to be accepted on the ICA network. The Access card system from the United Kingdom joined the ICA/Eurocard alliance in 1972.

In 1979, Master Charge: The Interbank Card was renamed MasterCard.

In 1983, MasterCard International Inc. became the first bank to use holograms as part of their card security. They acquired the Cirrus network of automated tellers in 1985.

In 1997, MasterCard took over the Access card; the Access brand was then retired. In 2002, MasterCard International merged with Europay International, another large credit-card issuer association, of which Eurocard had become a part in 1992. MasterCard became a Delaware in connection with the merger, as well as in anticipation of an IPO.

The company, which had been organized as a cooperative of banks, had an initial public offering on May 25, 2006, selling 95.5 million shares at $39 each. The stock is traded on the NYSE under the symbol MA, with a market capitalization of $367.1 billion as of May 2021. The deal was designed to maintain the value of the brand and minimise regulatory costs.

In August 2010, MasterCard Worldwide, as it had been rebranded, expanded its e-commerce offering with the acquisition of DataCash, a UK-based payment processing and fraud/risk management provider. In March 2012, MasterCard announced the expansion of its mobile contactless payments program, including markets across the Middle East.

In spring 2014, MasterCard acquired Australia's leading rewards program manager company Pinpoint for an undisclosed amount. In August 2017, Mastercard acquired Brighterion, a company with a portfolio of intellectual property in the areas of artificial intelligence and machine learning. Brighterion holds several patents.

In April 2021, Mastercard created a calculator that gathers information and measures the carbon footprints of the customers in order to help them know how much they are contributing in carbon emissions and global warming.

Following the 2022 Russian invasion of Ukraine, Mastercard complied with United States sanctions and banned cards from being issued or used in Russia, including foreign cards from other countries. Mastercard suspended all business operations in Russia, which had accounted for 4% of their revenue. However, bank cards themselves continue to work in Russia due to the transfer of internal transactions to the Russian National Card Payment System.

Finances 

As of 2020, Mastercard ranked 191 on the Fortune 500 list of the largest United States corporations by revenue.

Market power 
Operating a payment processing network entails risk of engaging in anticompetitive practices due to the many parties involved (that is, the customer and their bank and the merchant and their bank). 

Few companies have faced more antitrust lawsuits both in the US and abroad.

United States
Mastercard, along with Visa, engaged in systematic parallel exclusion against American Express during the 1980s and 1990s. Mastercard used exclusivity clauses in its contracts and blacklists to prevent banks from doing business with American Express. Such exclusionary clauses and other written evidence were used by the United States Department of Justice in regulatory actions against Mastercard and Visa. Discover has sued Mastercard for similar issues.

Both Mastercard and Visa have paid approximately $3 billion in damages resulting from a class-action lawsuit filed in January 1996 for debit card swipe fee price fixing. The litigation cites several retail giants as plaintiffs, including Wal-Mart, Sears, Roebuck & Co., and Safeway.

In 1996, about 4 million merchants sued Mastercard in federal court for making them accept debit cards if they wanted to accept credit cards and dramatically increasing credit card swipe fees. This case was settled with a multibillion-dollar payment in 2003. This was the largest antitrust award in history.

In 1998, the Department of Justice sued Mastercard over rules prohibiting their issuing banks from doing business with American Express or Discover. The Department of Justice won in 2001 and the verdict withstood appeal. American Express also filed suit.

On August 23, 2001, Mastercard International Inc. was sued for violating the Florida Deceptive and Unfair Trade Practices Act.

On November 15, 2004, Mastercard Inc. paid damages to American Express, due to anticompetitive practices that prevented American Express from issuing cards through U.S. banks, and paid $1.8 billion for settlement.

Swipe fee fixing and merchant discount bans 

On November 27, 2012, a federal judge entered an order granting preliminary approval to a proposed settlement to a class-action lawsuit filed in 2005 by merchants and trade associations against Mastercard and Visa. The suit was filed due to alleged price-fixing practices employed by Mastercard and Visa. About one-fourth of the named class plaintiffs have decided to opt-out of the settlement. Opponents object to provisions that would bar future lawsuits and prevent merchants from opting out of significant portions of the proposed settlement.

Plaintiffs allege that Visa Inc. and Mastercard fixed interchange fees, also known as swipe fees, that are charged to merchants for the privilege of accepting payment cards. In their complaint, the plaintiffs also alleged that the defendants unfairly interfere with merchants from encouraging customers to use less expensive forms of payment such as lower-cost cards, cash, and checks.

A settlement of $6.24 billion got preliminary approval in November, 2019. A settlement of $5.54B was approved in 2019. Certain merchants appealed the settlement and were heard. The case is ongoing .

Antitrust settlement with U.S. Justice Department 
In October 2010, Mastercard and Visa reached a settlement with the U.S. Justice Department in another antitrust case. The companies agreed to allow merchants displaying their logos to decline certain types of cards (because interchange fees differ), or to offer consumers discounts for using cheaper cards.

ATM operators 
Mastercard, along with Visa, has been sued in a class action by ATM operators that claim the credit card networks' rules effectively fix ATM access fees. The suit claims that this is a restraint of trade in violation of federal law. The lawsuit was filed by the National ATM Council and independent operators of automated teller machines. More specifically, it is alleged that Mastercard's and Visa's network rules prohibit ATM operators from offering lower prices for transactions over PIN-debit networks that are not affiliated with Visa or Mastercard. The suit says that this price-fixing artificially raises the price that consumers pay using ATMs, limits the revenue that ATM operators earn, and violates the Sherman Act's prohibition against unreasonable restraints of trade. Johnathan Rubin, an attorney for the plaintiffs said, "Visa and Mastercard are the ringleaders, organizers, and enforcers of a conspiracy among U.S. banks to fix the price of ATM access fees in order to keep the competition at bay."

Oceania 
In 2003, the Reserve Bank of Australia required that interchange fees be dramatically reduced, from about 0.95% of the transaction to approximately 0.5%. One notable result has been the reduced use of reward cards and increased use of debit cards. Australia also prohibited the no surcharge rule, a policy established by credit card networks like Visa and Mastercard to prevent merchants from charging a credit card usage fee to the cardholder. A surcharge would mitigate or even exceed the merchant discount paid by a merchant, but would also make the cardholder more reluctant to use the card as the method of payment. Australia has also made changes to the interchange rates on debit cards and has considered abolishing interchange fees altogether.

As of November 2006, New Zealand was considering similar actions, following a Commerce Commission lawsuit alleging price-fixing by Visa and Mastercard. In New Zealand, merchants pay a 1.8% fee on every credit card transaction.

Europe 
The European Union has repeatedly criticized Mastercard for monopolistic trade practices. In April 2009, Mastercard reached a settlement with the European Union in an antitrust case, promising to reduce debit card swipe fees to 0.2 percent of purchases. In December 2010, a senior official from the European Central Bank called for a break-up of the Visa/Mastercard duopoly by the creation of a new European debit card for use in the Single Euro Payments Area (SEPA).

WikiLeaks published documents showing that American authorities lobbied Russia to defend the interests of Visa and Mastercard. In response Mastercard blocked payments to WikiLeaks. Members of the European Parliament expressed concern that payments from European citizens to a European corporation could apparently be blocked by the United States, and called for a further reduction in the dominance of Visa and Mastercard in the European payment system.

In 2013, Mastercard was under investigation by the European Union for the high fees it charged merchants to accept cards issued outside the EU, compared to cards issued in the EU, as well as other anti-competitive practices that could hinder electronic commerce and international trade, and high fees associated with premium credit cards. The EU's competition regulator said that these fees were of special concern because of the growing role of non-cash payments. Mastercard was banned from charging fees on cross-border transactions conducted wholly within the EU via a ruling by the European Commission in 2007. The European Commission said that their investigation also included large differences in fees across national borders. For instance, a €50 payment might cost €0.10 in the Netherlands but eight times that amount in Poland. The Commission argues that Mastercard rules that prohibit merchants from enjoying better terms offered in other EU countries may be against antitrust law.

The European Consumer Organisation (BEUC) praised the action against Mastercard. BEUC said interbank fees push up prices and hurt consumers. BEUC Director General Monique Goyens said, "So in the end, all consumers are hit by a scheme which ultimately rewards the card company and issuing bank."

In January 2019, the European Commission imposed an antitrust fine of €570,566,000 to Mastercard for "obstructing merchants' access to cross-border card payment services", due to Mastercard's rules obliging acquiring banks to apply the interchange fees of the country where a retailer was located. The Commission concluded that Mastercard's rules prevented retailers from benefitting from lower fees and restricted competition between banks cross border, in breach of EU antitrust rules. The infringement of antitrust rules ended when Mastercard amended its rules due to the entering into force of the Interchange Fee Regulation in 2015, which introduced caps on interchange fees. The Commission did grant Mastercard a 10% reduction of the fine however, in return for Mastercard acknowledging the facts and cooperating with the antitrust investigation.

In February 2021, following an investigation by the British Payment Systems Regulator, Mastercard admitted liability for breaching competition rules in relation to pre-paid cards.

Other issues

United States internet gambling transactions 
Mastercard, Visa, and other credit cards have been used to fund accounts since online gambling began in the mid-1990s.

On March 20, 2000, the United States District Court for the Eastern District of Louisiana, reviewed motions in Re: MasterCard International Inc. regarding multi-district litigation alleging Mastercard illegally interacted with a number of internet casinos. The plaintiffs alleged, among other claims, that Mastercard had violated the Federal Wire Act. They sought financial relief for losses suffered at online gambling sites outside the United States.

The District Court's ruling on February 23, 2001, later upheld by the United States Court of Appeals for the Fifth Circuit, sided with Mastercard. The Firth Circuit also clarified the application of the Wire Act to illegal online gambling. The Court determined that the wire act only applied to gambling activities related to a "sporting event or contest". Therefore, the court could not conclude that Mastercard had violated the Wire Act.

When PASPA was overturned May 14, 2018, Mastercard had to provide new guidance to its member banks. It clarified that state location restrictions apply to the individual placing the wager, not the member bank processing the transaction. According to various state gaming laws, sports betting providers must use Internet geolocation to determine a customer's physical location prior to accepting a wager. The Independent Community Bankers of America specifically requested information about a new online gambling merchant category code. Mastercard has dedicated MCC 7801 to online gambling. This code is distinct from 7800 for government owned lotteries and 7802 for government licensed horse and dog tracks.

Blocking payments to WikiLeaks 
In December 2010, Mastercard blocked all payments to whistleblowing platform WikiLeaks due to claims that they engage in illegal activity. In response, a group of online activists Anonymous organized a denial-of-service attack; as a result, the Mastercard website experienced downtime on December 8–9, 2010. On December 9, 2010, the servers of Mastercard underwent a massive attack as part of an Operation Avenge Assange for closing down payments to WikiLeaks. The security of thousands of credit cards was compromised during that attack due to a phishing-site set up by the attackers. However, Mastercard denied this, stating that account data had "not been placed at risk". WikiLeaks' spokesman said, "We neither condemn nor applaud these attacks." U.N. High Commissioner for Human Rights Navi Pillay said that closing down credit lines for donations to WikiLeaks "could be interpreted as an attempt to censor the publication of information, thus potentially violating WikiLeaks' right to freedom of expression".

In July 2011, Iceland-based IT firm DataCell, the company that enabled WikiLeaks to accept credit and debit card donations, said it would take legal action against Visa Europe and Mastercard, and that it would move immediately to try to force the two companies to resume allowing payments to the website. Earlier on December 8, 2010, DataCell's CEO Andreas Fink had stated that "suspension of payments towards WikiLeaks is a violation of the agreements with their customers." On July 14, 2011, DataCell announced they had filed a complaint with the European Commission claiming the closure by Visa and Mastercard of Datacell's access to the payment card networks violated the competition rules of the European Community.

On July 12, 2012, a Reykjavík court ruled that Valitor, Visa and Mastercard's partner in Iceland, had to start processing donations within fourteen days or pay daily fines to the amount of ISK 800,000 (some $6000) for each day after that time, to open the payment gateway. Valitor also had to pay DataCell's litigation costs of ISK 1,500,000.

Corporate branding of all Nigerian identity cards
In 2014, pursuant to an agreement between Mastercard and the Nigerian Government, acting through the National Identity Management Commission, the new Nigerian ID cards bear the Mastercard logo, contain personal database data and double as payment cards, irrevocably linking such payments to the individuals, sparking criticism by the Civil Rights Congress alleging that it "represents a stamped ownership of a Nigerian by an American company ... reminiscent of the logo pasted on the bodies of African slaves transported across the Atlantic."

Selling of credit card data
In 2018, Bloomberg News reported that Google had paid millions of dollars to Mastercard for its users' credit card data for advertising purposes. The deal had not been publicly announced.

Regulatory ban In India 
On July 14, 2021, the Reserve Bank of India (RBI) indefinitely barred Mastercard from issuing new debit or credit cards to domestic Indian customers starting July 22, 2021, for violating data localization and storage rules as set by RBI on April 6, 2018, under Payment and Settlement Systems Act, 2007 (PSS Act). This ban does not affect cards already issued and working in India. Mastercard is the third major payment systems provider to be restricted in India after American Express and Diners Club International. On June 16, 2022, the business restrictions imposed were lifted by RBI with immediate effect.

Offerings 
Depending on the geographical location, Mastercard issues cards in tiers, from the lowest to the highest, Traditional/Classic/Standard, Gold/Titanium, Platinum, World and World Elite.

Through a partnership with an Internet company that specializes in personalized shopping, Mastercard introduced a Web shopping mall on April 16, 2010, that it said can pinpoint with considerable accuracy what its cardholders are likely to purchase.

Mastercard teamed with Apple in September 2014, to incorporate a new mobile wallet feature into Apple's new iPhone and Apple Watch models known as Apple Pay, enabling users to more readily use their Mastercard, and other credit cards.

In May 2020, Mastercard announced the Mastercard Track Business Payment Service. The service will provide business-to-business payments between buyers and suppliers. According to the head of global commercial products, it "creates a directory of suppliers, enabling suppliers to publish their payment rules so they can better control how they receive payments while making it easier for buyers to find suppliers and understand their requirements".

On February 10, 2021, Mastercard announced their support of cryptocurrencies saying that later in 2021, Mastercard will start supporting select cryptocurrencies directly on their network. One of the main focus areas that Mastercard wants to support is using digital assets for payments, and that crypto assets will need to offer the stability people need in a vehicle for spending, not investment. In October 2021, Mastercard announced that through its partnership with Bakkt, any bank or merchant on its network would soon be able to offer crypto services. In June 2022, Mastercard announced that it would now be allowing cardholders to purchase NFTs via various NFT scaling platforms.

Prepaid debit cards
Mastercard, Comerica Bank, and the U.S. Treasury Department teamed up in 2008 to create the Direct Express Debit Mastercard. The federal government uses the Express Debit product to issue electronic payments to people who do not have bank accounts. Comerica Bank is the issuing bank for the debit card.

The Direct Express cards give recipients a number of consumer protections.

In June 2013, Mastercard announced a partnership with British Airways to offer members the Executive Club Multi-currency Cash Passport, which will allow members to earn extra points and make multi-currency payments. The Passport card allows users to load up to ten currencies (euro, pound, U.S. dollar, Turkish lira, Swiss franc, Australian dollar, Canadian dollar, New Zealand dollar, U.A.E. dirham, and South African rand) at a locked-in rate. When used, the card selects the local currency to ensure the best exchange rate, and if the local currency is not already loaded onto the card, funds are used from other currencies.

QkR 
QkR is a mobile payment app developed by Mastercard, for the purpose of ordering products and services through a smartphone with payments charged to the associated credit card. It is being deployed for use in large-scale events, such as sport events, concerts, or movie theaters. Unlike other Mastercard mobile payment apps such as Pay Pass, QkR does not use NFC from the phone, but rather an Internet connection.

Users can open the app, scan a QR code located on the back of the seat in front of them, and place orders for refreshments of their choice. The order is dispatched to a nearby concession stand, from where a runner delivers the items to the patrons' seats. It is already deployed in Australian movie theaters and is being tested in Yankee Stadium.

QkR is being marketed to vendors as a replacement for other mobile payment apps and a mobile ordering app, either distributed by the vendor (such as Starbucks's app, McDonald's' app, or Chipotle's mobile ordering app) or by a third party, such as Square, headed by Twitter cofounder Jack Dorsey.

Mastercard Contactless 

Mastercard Contactless (formerly branded PayPass) is an EMV-compatible, contactless payment feature similar to American Express' ExpressPay, and Visa Contactless. All three use the same symbol as shown on the right. It is based on the ISO/IEC 14443 standard that provides cardholders with a simpler way to pay by tapping a payment card or other payment device, such as a phone or key fob, on a point-of-sale terminal reader rather than swiping or inserting a card. Contactless can currently be used on transactions up to and including 100 GBP, 50 EUR, 80 CHF, 50 USD, 100 CAD, 200 SEK, 500 NOK, 100 PLN, 350 DKK, 80 NZD, 100 AUD, 1000 RUB, 500 UAH, 500 TRY or 2000 INR.

In 2003, Mastercard concluded a nine-month PayPass market trial in Orlando, Florida, with JPMorgan Chase, Citibank, and MBNA. More than 16,000 cardholders and more than 60 retailer locations participated in the market trial. In addition, Mastercard worked with Nokia and the Nokia 6131, AT&T Wireless, and JPMorgan Chase to incorporate Mastercard PayPass into mobile phones using near-field communication technology, in Dallas, Texas. In 2011, Google and Mastercard launched Google Wallet, an Android application which allows a mobile device to send credit/debit card information directly to a Paypass-enabled payment terminal, bypassing the need for a physical card, up until the creation of Android Pay.

During late 2015, Citicards in the US stopped issuing Paypass-enabled plastic, but the keyfob was still available upon request. Effective July 16, 2016, Citicards stopped supporting Paypass completely. While existing plastic and keyfobs continued to work until their expiration date, no new Paypass-enabled hardware was issued to US customers after that date.

Brand
Mastercard is associated with security and is believed to be reliable in emergencies. Antitrust litigation over the years has damaged the brand.

Mastercard's current advertising campaign tagline is Priceless. It started in 1997. The slogan associated with the campaign is There are some things money can't buy. For everything else, there's Mastercard. The Priceless campaign in more recent iterations has been applicable to both Mastercard's credit card and debit card products. They also use the Priceless description to promote products such as their priceless travel site, which features deals and offers for Mastercard holders, and priceless cities, offers for people in specified locations.

In mid-2006, MasterCard International changed its name to MasterCard Worldwide. This was to suggest a more global scale. In addition, the company introduced a new corporate logo adding a third circle to the two that had been used in the past (the familiar card logo, resembling a Venn diagram, remained unchanged). A new corporate tagline was introduced at the same time—The Heart of Commerce.

In July 2016, Mastercard introduced their new rebranding, along with a new corporate logo. In addition, they changed their service name from "MasterCard" to "mastercard".

In January 2019, Mastercard removed its name from its logo, leaving just the overlapping discs.

In 2021, Mastercard was ranked number 13 on Morning Consult's list of most trusted brands.

Sports sponsorships 
Mastercard sponsors major sporting events and teams throughout the world. These include rugby's New Zealand, the MLB, the UEFA Champions League and the PGA Tour's Arnold Palmer Invitational. Previously, it also sponsored the FIFA World Cup but withdrew its contract after a court settlement and its rival, Visa, took up the contract in 2007. In 1997, Mastercard was the main sponsor of the Mastercard Lola Formula One team, which withdrew from the 1997 Formula One season after its first race due to financial problems. It also partners the Brazil national football team and the Copa Libertadores.

Mastercard was also the title sponsor for the Alamo Bowl game from 2002 until 2005.

In late 2018, Mastercard became the first major sponsor for League of Legends esports. The company sponsors the League of Legends World Championship, Mid-Season Invitational, and the All-stars event for League of Legends.

Until 2018, Mastercard was the sponsor of the Memorial Cup, the CHL's annual championship between its three leagues.

In September 2022, Mastercard acquired the title sponsorship rights for all international and domestic home matches organized by the Board of Cricket Control in India.

Corporate affairs

Mastercard has its headquarters in the Mastercard International Global Headquarters in Purchase, New York. The Global Operations Center is located in O'Fallon, a suburb of St. Louis, Missouri.

Mastercard was listed as one of the best companies to work for in 2013 by Forbes. In 2016, Mastercard UK became one of 144 companies who signed the HM Treasury's Women in Finance Charter, a pledge for balanced gender representation in the company.

Management and board of directors 
Key executives include:

 Michael Miebach: president and chief executive officer
 Walt Macnee: vice chairman
 Robert Reeg: president – global technology & operations
 Raja Rajamannar: chief marketing officer – global marketing
 Gary Flood: president – products & services
 Noah Hanft: general counsel, chief franchise officer and corporate president 
 Michael Fraccaro: chief human resources officer
 Chris McWilton: president – North American markets
 Ann Cairns: president – international markets
 Javier Perez: president – Europe
 Kevin Stanton: Chief Transformation Officer
 Ari Sarker: president – Asia-Pacific
 Betty Devita: president – Canada
 Gilberto Caldart: president – Latin America & Caribbean

Prior to its IPO in 2006, Mastercard was an association that had a board of directors composed of banks. The current board of directors includes the following individuals:
Merit Janow, Non-Executive Chair, and Dean Emerita, School of International and Public Affairs, Columbia University
 Silvio Barzi, former senior advisor, and executive officer, UniCredit Group
David R. Carlucci, former chairman and chief executive officer, IMS Health Incorporated
 Steven J. Freiberg, senior advisor, Boston Consulting Group
 Nancy J. Karch, director emeritus, McKinsey & Company
 Marc Olivie, president, and chief executive officer, W.C. Bradley Co.
 Rima Qureshi, senior vice president strategic projects, Ericsson
 Jose Octavio Reyes Lagunes, vice chairman, Coca-Cola Export Corporation, The Coca-Cola Company
 Mark Schwartz, vice chairman, The Goldman Sachs Group, Inc., chairman, Goldman Sachs Asia Pacific
 Edward Suning Tian, chairman, China Broadband Capital Partners, L.P.
 Jackson P. Tai, former vice-chairman, and chief executive officer, DBS Group and DBS Bank Ltd.

In June 2013, Mastercard announced the promotion of Gilberto Caldart to head of Latin America and Caribbean divisions. Caldart joined Mastercard from Citi Brazil in 2008, where he served as country business manager and oversaw the retail bank, consumer finance, and card business.

World Beyond Cash
In 2017, CEO Ajay Banga reinforced the company's goal of extending financial services to those outside the current system by bringing digital payment systems to the unbanked around the world. The company invested $500M in India with offices in Pune and Vadodara to help Mastercard bring cashless transactions to the 2nd largest population in the world. The company also is scheduled to invest an additional $750M in cashless apps and technology, especially focused on India between 2017 and 2020.

Banknet

Mastercard operates Banknet, a global telecommunications network linking all Mastercard card issuers, acquirers, and data processing centers into a single financial network. The operations hub is located in St. Louis, Missouri. Banknet uses the ISO 8583 protocol.

Mastercard's network differs significantly from Visa's. Visa's is a star-based system where all endpoints terminate at one of several main data centers, where all transactions are processed centrally. Mastercard's network is an edge-based, peer-to-peer network where transactions travel a meshed network directly to other endpoints, without the need to travel to a single point. This allows Mastercard's network to be much more resilient, in that a single failure cannot isolate a large number of endpoints.

COVID-19 assistance

Mastercard approached TrustStamp in 2018 and invited them to join the Mastercard Start Path Program. The goal of the partnership is integrating TrustStamp's biometric and facial recognition technology into the Mastercard Well Pass platform. This partnership would enable biometric tracking of vaccinations, especially for children. The program is based on the TrustStamp Evergreen Hash, which is a personal digital token that is tied to a fingerprint, palm or face. The AI software creates a 3D "mask" and then the original data is destroyed. The token would then adapt as the individual does, creating a lifelong identification system.

This system is now being implemented in West Africa through partnership with the Global Alliance for Vaccines and Immunization (GAVI), Bill and Melinda Gates Foundation and NuData. The Mastercard wellness program was adapted in response to the COVID-19 crisis and now Mastercard is working with TrustStamp and GAVI to bring integrated vaccine verification and payment systems to Developing countries throughout the world.

See also

 RuPay
 Access
 Cirrus
 Damage waiver
 Entrust Bankcard
 Maestro
 3-D Secure
 Mondex
 Octopus card
 Payoneer
 Redecard

References

External links

 
 Corporate website
 Business website
 Mastercard Priceless Travel site

 
Credit cards
Credit card issuer associations
Financial services companies of the United States
Contactless smart cards
Online payments
Former cooperatives of the United States
Multinational companies headquartered in the United States
Financial services companies based in New York (state)
Companies based in Purchase, New York
American companies established in 1966
Financial services companies established in 1966
1966 establishments in New York (state)
Companies listed on the New York Stock Exchange
2006 initial public offerings